Jarno De Smedt (born 4 January 2000) is a Belgian archer. He competed in the men's individual event at the 2020 Summer Olympics.

References

External links
 
 
 

2000 births
Living people
Belgian male archers
Olympic archers of Belgium
Archers at the 2020 Summer Olympics
Place of birth missing (living people)